Sir Mark Edward Welland,  (born 18 October 1955) is professor of nanotechnology at the University of Cambridge and head of the Nanoscience Centre. He has been a fellow of St John's College, Cambridge, since 1986 and started his career in nanotechnology at IBM Research, where he was part of the team that developed one of the first scanning tunnelling microscopes. He was elected as the master of St Catharine's College, Cambridge and took up office on 1 October 2016.

Early life and education
Welland was born on 18 October 1955. He completed a Bachelor of Science (BSc) degree in physics from the University of Leeds in 1979 and Master of Science and Doctor of Philosophy (PhD) degree in physics from the University of Bristol in 1984 for research on grain boundaries.

Career
Welland moved to Cambridge in 1987 and set up the first tunnelling microscopy group in the UK in collaboration with John Pethica. Currently at the Nanoscience Centre at the University of Cambridge researches into a number of aspects of nanotechnology ranging from sensors for medical applications to understanding and controlling the properties of nanoscale structures and devices.

In a recent award by the UK Research Councils, Welland has been made Director of an Interdisciplinary Research Collaboration in nanotechnology that, along with a purpose-built facility, represents an investment of $28 million for nanotechnology research at Cambridge. Until 2008, he was Editor-in-Chief of the Institute of Physics journal Nanotechnology, established in 1990, and, along with many other contributions at an international level, co-chairs the recently established Co-operative Research Initiative in Nanotechnology (CORINT) between the UK and Japan with Hiroyuki Sakaki of the University of Tokyo. He is also a Member of Council of the Royal United Services Institute.

Welland is also on the advisory board of Seraphima Ventures – a venture capital firm focusing mainly on nanotechnology startup companies.

In April 2008 he was appointed Chief Scientific Adviser (CSA) to the Ministry of Defence.

Welland's research has been funded by the Biotechnology and Biological Sciences Research Council (BBSRC) and the Engineering and Physical Sciences Research Council (EPSRC).

In 2016 he was appointed Master of St Catharine's College, Cambridge, where he took office in September 2016.

Personal life
Welland is married to Esme Lynora Otun. Together they have four children: two sons and two daughters.

Awards and honours
Welland was knighted in the 2011 Queen's Birthday Honours. In 2002, his contributions to nanotechnology research were recognised through his election to Fellowships of the Royal Society and Royal Academy of Engineering.  His nomination for the Royal Society reads:

In 2014, he was awarded an honorary Doctor of Science from the University of Bristol.

References 

Living people
British physicists
British nanotechnologists
Fellows of the Royal Society
Fellows of the Royal Academy of Engineering
Fellows of the Institute of Physics
IBM employees
Fellows of St John's College, Cambridge
Alumni of the University of Leeds
Alumni of the University of Bristol
Chief Scientific Advisers to the Ministry of Defence
Knights Bachelor
1955 births
Masters of St Catharine's College, Cambridge
Engineering professors at the University of Cambridge